Pabstiella tabacina is a species of orchid plant.

References 

tabacina